Alfredo is a cognate of the Anglo-Saxon name Alfred and a common Italian, Galician, Portuguese and Spanish language personal name.

People with the given name include:

Alfredo (born 1946), Brazilian footballer born as Alfredo Mostarda Filho
Alfredo II (1920–1997), Brazilian footballer born as Alfredo Ramos dos Santos
Albee Benitez (born 1966), Filipino-American businessman and politician born as Alfredo Benitez
Aldo Sambrell, a European actor also known as Alfredo Sanchez Brell
Alfredo (album), an album by Freddie Gibbs and the Alchemist
Alfredo Ábalos (born 1986), Argentine footballer
Alfredo Aceves (born 1982), Mexican baseball player
Alfredo Aglietti (born 1970), Italian footballer and manager
Alfredo Aguilar (born 1988), Paraguayan goaltender
Alfredo Armas Alfonzo (1921–1990), Venezuelan writer
Alfredo Alonso, Cuban-born media executive with Clear Channel Radio
Alfredo Álvarez Calderón (1918–2001), Peruvian diver
Alfredo Amézaga (born 1978), Mexican baseball player
Alfredo Anderson (born 1978), Panamanian footballer
Alfredo Azancot (1872–?), Chilean-based Portuguese architect
Alfredo Baldomir (1884–1948), President of Uruguay, soldier and architect 
Alfredo Baquerizo (1859–1951), President of Ecuador
Alfredo Bifulco (born 1997), Italian footballer
Alfredo Binda (1902–1986), Italian world champion cyclist
Alfredo Bogarín (born 1936), Paraguayan fencer
Alfredo Bóia (born 1975), Portuguese footballer
Alfredo Bonanno (born 1937), Italian conspiracy theorist
Alfredo Brilhante da Costa (1904–1980), Brazilian footballer
Alfredo Bryce (born 1939), Peruvian writer
Al Cabrera (1881–1964), Spanish baseball player born Alfredo Cabrera
Alfredo Cachia Zammit (1890–1960), Maltese philanthropist and politician
Alfredo Calderón (1918–2001), Peruvian diver
Alfredo Cantu Gonzalez (1946–1968), American United States Marine Corps sergeant
Alfredo Cardona Peña (1917–1995), Costa Rican journalist, writer, biographer, poet, and essayist
Alfredo Cariello (born 1979), Italian footballer
Alfredo Carmona (born 1971), Peruvian footballer
Alfredo Carrillo (born 1976), Paraguayan swimmer
Alfredo Caruana Gatto (1868–1926), Maltese lawyer, politician and naturalist
Alfredo Casella (1883–1947), Italian composer, pianist and conductor
Alfredo Casero (born 1962), Argentine musician, actor and comedian
Alfredo Castro (born 1955), Chilean actor
Alfredo Castro (born 1962), Portuguese goalkeeper
Alfredo Catalani (1854–1893), Italian operatic composer
Alfredo Challenger (born 1979), Caymanian footballer
Alfredo Cristiani (born 1947), President of El Salvador (1989–1994)
Alfredo del Águila (1935–2018), Mexican footballer
Alfredo Devincenzi (1907–?), Italian-Argentine footballer
Alfredo Di Stéfano (1926–2014), Argentine footballer and coach
Alfredo Donnarumma, Italian footballer
Alfredo Esteves (born 1976), Portuguese-East Timorese footballer and manager
Alfredo Fígaro (born 1984), Dominican baseball pitcher
Alfredo Filippini (1924-2020) was an Italian sculptor, painter and illustrator.
Alfredo Foni (1911–1985), Italian footballer and coach
Alfredo Francisco Martins, Brazilian footballer born 1992
Alfredo Frausto (born 1983), Mexican footballer
Alfredo Gil (1915–1999), Mexican singer and founding member of the Trio los Panchos
Alfredo Gonzalez (disambiguation)
Alfredo González Tahuilán (born 1980), Mexican footballer
Alfredo Griffin (born 1957), Dominican baseball player and coach
Alfredo Gutiérrez (disambiguation), multiple people
Alfredo Guzmán (born 1943), Mexican swimmer
Alfredo Hernández (disambiguation)
Alfredo Jahn (1867–1940), Venezuelan civil engineer, botanist and geographer 
Alfredo Jesus da Silva, Portuguese footballer
Alfredo Kraus (1927–1999), Spanish operatic tenor
Alfredo Lim (1929-2020), Chinese-Filipino politician and former mayor of the city of Manila
Alfredo Lucero (born 1979), Argentine cyclist
Alfredo Marte (born 1989), Dominican baseball player
Alfredo Mazacotte (born 1987), Paraguayan footballer
Alfredo Mejía (born 1990), Honduran footballer
Alfredo Mendoza (born 1963), Paraguayan footballer
Alfred Molina (born 1953), English-American actor born Alfredo Molina
Alfredo Morales (born 1990), German footballer
Alfredo Morelos (born 1996), Colombian footballer
Alfredo Moreno (1980–2021), Argentine footballer
Alfredo Moreno Caño (born 1981), Spanish track cyclist
Alfredo Moreno Charme (born 1956), Chilean diplomat and politician
Alfredo Moreno Echeverría (born 1988), Chilean politician
Alfredo Mostarda Filho (born 1946), Brazilian footballer
Alfredo Olivera (1908–?), Uruguayan chess player
Alfredo Omar Tena (born 1985), Mexican footballer
Alfredo Ortuño (born 1991), Spanish footballer
Alfredo Ottaviani (1890–1979), Italian cardinal of the Catholic Church
Alfredo Ovando Candía (1918–1982), Bolivian president and dictator and general
Alfredo Pacheco (1982–2015), Salvadoran footballer
Alfredo Pacini (1888–1967), Italian Cardinal of the Roman Catholic Church
Al Pacino (born 1940), American actor
Alfredo Padilla (born 1989), Colombian footballer
Alfredo Palacio (born 1939), President of Ecuador (2005–2007)
Alfredo Palacios (1880–1965), Argentine politician
Alfredo Pascual (born 1948), Filipino businessman and former president of the University of the Philippines
Alfredo Pedraza (born 2000), Spanish footballer
Al Pedrique (born 1960), Venezuelan baseball player and coach born Alfredo José Pedrique Garcia
Alfredo Pereira (born 1992), Portuguese acrobatic gymnast
Alfredo Pérez (born 1952), Venezuelan boxer
Alfredo Pián (1912–1990), Argentinian racing driver
Alfredo Prieto (1965–2015), Salvadoran-American serial killer
Alfredo Pussetto (born 1994), Argentine footballer
Alfredo Quesada (born 1949), Peruvian footballer
Alfredo Quintana (1988–2021), Portuguese handballer
Alfredo Ramírez (born 1988), Argentine footballer
Alfredo Ramos (1924–2012), Brazilian footballer
Alfredo Ramúa (born 1986), Argentine footballer
Alfredo Roberts (born 1965), American football player and coach
Alfredo Rojas (born 1937), Argentine footballer
Alfredo Rojas (born 1987), Chilean footballer
Alfredo Rojas (born 1991), Peruvian footballer
Alfredo Oscar Saint-Jean (1926–1987), Argentine Army major general and politician, President of Argentina in 1982
Alfredo Saldívar (born 1990), Mexican goalkeeper
Alfredo Sánchez (disambiguation)
Alfredo Santaelena (born 1967), Spanish footballer
Alfredo dos Santos (1920–1997), Brazilian footballer 
Alfredo Shahanga (born 1965), Tanzanian retired long-distance runner
Alfredo Simón (born 1981), Dominican baseball pitcher
Alfredo Sirkis (1950–2020), Brazilian politician and writer
Alfredo Stephens (born 1994), Panamanian footballer
Alfredo Stroessner (1912–2006), President of Paraguay (1954–1989) and general
Alfredo Talavera (born 1982), Mexican goalkeeper
Alfredo Tena (born 1956), Mexican footballer
Alfredo Alves Tinoco (1904–1975), Brazilian footballer
Alfredo Torero (1930–2004), Peruvian anthropologist
Alfredo Toro Hardy (born 1950), Venezuelan author, diplomat and public intellectual 
Alfredo Torres (born 1931), Mexican footballer
Alfredo Valente (1899–1973), Italian-American photographer
Alfredo Valente (born 1980), Canadian footballer
Alfredo Valentini (born 1946), Sammarinese sports shooter
Alfredo Virginio Cano (born 1982), Argentine footballer
Alfredo Zayas y Alfonso (1861–1934), Cuban lawyer, poet and President of Cuba (1921–1925)
Arkangel de la Muerte (1966–2018), Mexican luchador and wrestler born as Alfredo Pasillas
Babù (born 1980), Brazilian footballer born as Alfredo Manzano Gutierrez
Fredy (born 1990), Angolan footballer born as Alfredo Kulembe Ribeiro
Freddy Gonzalez (born 1978), Filipino footballer born as Alfredo Fernando Razón Gonzalez
Marcão (born 1986), Brazilian footballer born as Alfredo Marcos da Silva Junior
Máyor (born 1984), Spanish footballer born as Alfredo Juan Mayordomo
Noronha (1918–2003), Brazilian footballer born as Alfredo Eduardo Barreto de Freitas Noronha.

See also
Anthony Alfredo (born 1999), American racing driver
Fettuccine Alfredo, an Italian pasta dish

Italian masculine given names
Spanish masculine given names
Portuguese masculine given names